Yevgeni Valentinovich Pesegov (born 21 February 1989) is a Russian professional footballer. He plays for FC Akron Tolyatti .

Club career
He made his professional debut in the Russian Second Division in 2006 for FC Krylia Sovetov-SOK Dimitrovgrad.

He made his Russian Premier League debut for PFC Krylia Sovetov Samara on 30 October 2009 in a game against FC Rubin Kazan.

On 2 September 2019, he moved from PFC Sochi to FC Rotor Volgograd.

External links

References

1989 births
Sportspeople from Krasnoyarsk
Living people
Russian footballers
Russia youth international footballers
Russia under-21 international footballers
Association football midfielders
PFC Krylia Sovetov Samara players
FC Volgar Astrakhan players
FC Nizhny Novgorod (2007) players
FC Khimki players
FC Tyumen players
FC Dynamo Saint Petersburg players
FC Orenburg players
PFC Sochi players
FC Rotor Volgograd players
FC Akron Tolyatti players
FC Tolyatti players
Russian Premier League players
Russian First League players
Russian Second League players